Sandokushi (三毒史, "The History of the Three Poisons") also known as triviṣa-itihāsa, is the sixth studio album by Japanese musician Ringo Sheena released on May 27, 2019, through EMI Records and Universal Music Japan. Similarly to her previous studio album Hi Izuru Tokoro (2014), the album is a compilation studio album compiling singles released from 2014 to 2019, as well as new compositions.

Track listing
All tracks written and arranged by Ringo Sheena, except where noted.

Credits and track listing adapted from Tidal and Universal Music Japan.

Personnel
Musicians

 Ringo Sheena – vocals
 Hiroji Miyamoto – featured vocals 
 Atsushi Sakurai – featured vocals 
 Shutoku Mukai – featured vocals 
 Ukigumo – featured vocals , guitar , sitar , additional vocals 
 Masayuki Hiizumi – featured vocals , keyboards , piano , synthesizer , wurli 
 Tortoise Matsumoto – featured vocals 
 Ichiyo Izawa – additional vocals , keyboards , piano 
 Vanya Moneva Choir – background vocals 
 Gakutaro Miyauchi – trombone 
 Junko Yamashiro – trombone 
 Katsuhisa Asari – trombone 
 Nobuhide Handa – trombone 
 Satoshi Sano – trombone 
 Yoichi Murata – trombone 
 Yuya Tamura – tuba 
 Michiyo Morikawa – flute 
 Hideyo Takakuwa – flute 
 Takuo Yamamoto – baritone saxophone , flute , tenor saxophone 
 Kei Suzuki – soprano saxophone , tenor saxophone 
 Masakuni Takeno – soprano saxophone , tenor saxophone , alto saxophone 
 Masato Honda – alto saxophone 
 Masato Honma – alto saxophone 
 Osamu Yoshida – baritone saxophone 
 Ryoji Ihara – tenor saxophone 
 Hitomi Niida – trumpet 
 Hitoshi Yokoyama – trumpet 
 Koji Nishimura – trumpet 
 Luis Valle – trumpet 
 Masahiko Sugasaka – trumpet 
 Sho Okumura – trumpet 
 Hirofumi Wada – horn 
 Karin Tajima – horn 
 Otohiko Fujita – horn 
 Tsutomu Isohata – horn 
 Tetsuya Cho – bassoon 
 Osamu Fukui – bassoon 
 Satoko Seki – piccolo 
 Satoshi Shoji – cor anglais 
 Kanami Araki – oboe 
 Masashi Togame – clarinet 
 Hideo Yamaki – drums 
 Midori Takada – cymbals , drums , glockenspiel , percussion , snare drums , tubular bells , vibraphone , timpani 
 Midorin – drums 
 Tom Tamada – drums 
 Toshiki Hata – drums 
 Kazumasa Ohya – cymbals , xylophone 
 Masato Kawase – percussion 
 Mataro – percussion 
 Shinji Asakura – percussion , timpani 
 U-Zhaan – tabla 
 Yukio Nagoshi – guitar 
 Hiro Yamaguchi – bass guitar 
 Keisuke Torigoe – bass guitar 
 Seiji Kameda – bass guitar 
 Masaki Hayashi – celesta , piano 
 Masanori Sasaji – piano 
 Tomoyuki Asakawa – harp 
 Yoshiaki Sato – accordion 
 Hidekatsu Onishi – glass harmonica 
 DJ Daishizen – sound effects 
 Akiko Shimauchi – viola 
 Amiko Watabe – viola 
 Chikako Nishimura – viola 
 Go Tomono – viola 
 Hirohito Furugawara – viola 
 Hyojin Kim – viola 
 Manami Tokutaka – viola 
 Masaki Shono – viola 
 Mayu Takashima – viola 
 Misato Futaki – viola 
 Sachie Onuma – viola 
 Saori Oka – viola 
 Yuji Yamada – viola 
 Ayaka Jomoto – violin 
 Ado Matsumoto – violin 
 Akane Irie – violin 
 Akiko Maruyama – violin 
 Daisuke Yamamoto – violin 
 Ayamu Koshikawa – violin 
 Eriko Ukimura – violin 
 Great Eida – violin 
 Haruko Yano – violin 
 Hikari Shimada – violin 
 Jo Kuwata – violin 
 Hiroki Muto – violin 
 Kioki Miki – violin 
 Kiyo Kido – violin 
 Kojiro Takizawa – violin 
 Kyoko Ishigame –  violin 
 Nagisa Kiriyama – violin 
 Naoko Ishibashi – violin 
 Natsue Kameda – violin 
 Osamu Iyoku – violin 
 Reina Ushiyama – violin 
 Shizuka Kawaguchi – violin 
 Syuga Hayashi – violin 
 Takayuki Oshikane – violin 
 Tatsuo Ogura – violin 
 Tonomi Tokunaga – violin 
 Ya Manabe – violin 
 Yui Kaneko – violin 
 Yuki Nakajima – violin 
 Yukinori Murata – violin 
 Yuri Kamei – violin 
 Yuya Yanagihara – violin 
 Ayano Kasahara – cello 
 Erika Makioka – cello 
 Junpei Hayashida – cello 
 Masami Horisawa – cello 
 Masutami Endo – cello 
 Tomoki Tai – cello 
 Toshiyuki Muranaka – cello 
 Wataru Mukai – cello 
 Yoshihiko Maeda – cello 
 Yuhki Shinozaki – cello 
 Kenji Takamizu – double bass 
 Teruhiko Saito – double bass 
 Yoshinobu Takeshita – double bass 

Production

 Ringo Sheena –  arrangement 
 Masanori Sasaji – arrangement 
 Neko Saito – conducting , horn arrangement (3, 11), string arrangement (3, 11), rhythm arrangement (11), arrangement (12)
 Youichi Murata – horn arrangement 
 Uni Inoue – music production 
 Vanya Moneva – choir conducting

Charts and sales

Charts

Sales

References

2019 albums
Ringo Sheena albums
Japanese-language albums
Universal Music Japan albums
EMI Records albums